The Ardennaise, is a breed of domestic chicken from the Ardennes plateau, in Belgium and eastern France. Its range extends from the Pays de Herve in Wallonia to the French département of Ardennes, and includes the Fagnes, the Famenne, and the valleys of the Amblève, the Ourthe and the Semois.

History

The Ardennaise is a traditional breed of the Ardennes region. The first description is that of Victor La Perre de Roo in 1882, at a time when the breed was already becoming rarer. A poultry breeders' club, the Union Avicole de Liége, was formed in 1893, and under its protection the Ardennaise enjoyed almost thirty years of success. Following the First World War, mass importations of yellow-legged birds from Italy, with much higher laying abilities, were a new threat. Selective breeding of the Ardennaise for better laying ability began in 1922, with some success. However, the Ardennaise was also cross-bred with Leghorn stock, resulting in a further decline. By 1940 there was no remaining trace of the breed. It was reconstituted over a period of about thirty years after the Second World War. In 2009 the total population was estimated at well over 2000.

A bantam Ardennaise was created in Liège in the space of five or six years from 1904. It was shown from 1907, and the standard was approved in 1913.

Both the Sans-queue and its tail-less bantam variant are critically endangered.

Characteristics

The Ardennaise is genetically close to the Bresse Gauloise. Twelve colours are recognised.

Use

References

Chicken breeds
Chicken breeds originating in Belgium
Chicken breeds originating in France